Hermann Ferdinand Fränkel (May 7, 1888 – April 8, 1977) was a German American classical scholar. He served as professor of Ancient Greek philology at Stanford University until 1953.

Son of professor Max Fränkel and younger brother of Charlotte Fränkel, Fränkel studied classics at Berlin, Bonn and Göttingen. He later lectured at Göttingen, but was denied a professorship after the Machtergreifung. Eluding increasing racial discrimination by the Nazis, Fränkel immigrated to the United States in 1935. He was offered a professorship at Stanford shortly after. He also held guest professorships at University of California, Berkeley and Cornell University.

Fränkel made important contributions to Early Greek poetry and philosophy interpretation. His son Hans Fränkel became a noted scholar of Chinese literature.

Bibliography
 1921 Die homerischen Gleichnisse, Göttingen: Vandenhoeck & Ruprecht.
 1930 Parmenidesstudien, Berlin: Weidmannsche Buchhandlung.
 1945 Ovid: A Poet Between Two Worlds, Berkeley: University of California Press.
 1951 Dichtung und Philosophie des frühen Griechentums, New York: American Philological Association.
 1955 Wege und Formen frühgriechischen Denkens, Munich: Beck.
 1957 Wege der Wissenschaft zur Wirklichkeit, Freiburg: H.F. Schulz.
 1961 Apollonius Rhodius: Argonautica, Oxford: Oxford University Press (Oxford Classical Texts)
 1964 Einleitung zur kritischen Ausgabe der Argonautika des Apollonios, Göttingen: Vandenhoeck & Ruprecht.
 1968 Noten zu den Argonautika des Apollonios, Munich: Beck.
 1974 Grammatik und Sprachwirklichkeit, Munich: Beck.

Notes

External links
 Memorial Resolution

1888 births
1977 deaths
Jewish emigrants from Nazi Germany to the United States
American classical scholars
Stanford University Department of Classics faculty
Corresponding Fellows of the British Academy